Mary Ann Lake Wallis (1821–1910) was a notable New Zealand orphanage matron. She was born in Dartford, Kent, England.

She was the founder and manager of the pioneer Hulmers orphanage in Motueka in 1867–1910.

References

1821 births
1910 deaths
People from Dartford
English emigrants to New Zealand
19th-century New Zealand people